Wo Hu is a 2006 Hong Kong crime film directed by Marco Mak and Wang Guangli. The film stars Eric Tsang, Francis Ng, Jordan Chan, Sonija Kwok, Michael Miu, Julian Cheung and with a special appearance by Shawn Yue.

Plot
Superintendent Wai (Michael Miu) organises an operation, code named WO HU, where he sends an army of undercover cops to spy on triad leader Jim (Eric Tsang). Jim discovers one of the undercover cops, Eric (Timmy Hung), and sends low level triad member, Killer (Shawn Yue), to assassinate him. Killer carries the hit but failed to flee Hong Kong afterwards. Then, Jim orders other triad leaders, Walter (Francis Ng) and Tommy (Julian Cheung), to keep it low in order to avoid the cops' attention. Tommy believes that his triad brothers are plotting to take his assets. After Tommy was exposed by an undercover cop in his crew, he must flee Hong Kong and leave his businesses to Jim. Tommy, however, does not trust Jim and plots against him.

Cast

Eric Tsang as Jim
Francis Ng as Walter
Jordan Chan as Fei
Sonija Kwok as Elaine
Michael Miu as Superintendent Wai
Julian Cheung as Tommy
Patrick Tang as Ball
Nie Yuan as Superintendent Mok
Kenny Wong as Big Mouth
Shawn Yue as Killer
Elliot Ngok as Boss Tong Chun
Qin Hailu as Sophie
Na Wei as Martin
Luo Xiangjin as Tacy
Zuki Lee as Massage girl
Johnny Lu as Chief Inspector Ming
Alex Lam as Kin
Ray Pang as Bean
Jonathan Lee as Dee
Joe Cheung as Chief Superintendent Kong
Timmy Hung as Eric
Chan Hung as Chuen
Man Yeung as Monkey
Wong Siu-yin as Tommy's mother
Michael Mak as Chiu
Au Hin-wai as Mr. Ho
Siu Hung as Walter's hired gangster
Lee Kin-hung as Uncle Mau
Tenny Tsang as Prison guard
Kwok Yuk-keung as Policeman

Box office
The film grossed US$576,058 at the Hong Kong box office from its theatrical run from 26 October to 16 November 2006 in Hong Kong.

References

External links

Wo Hu at Hong Kong Cinemagic

2006 films
2006 crime thriller films
Hong Kong crime thriller films
Triad films
Cantonese-language films
Films set in Hong Kong
Films shot in Hong Kong
2000s Hong Kong films